Dallas Ice Arena was an indoor arena in Dallas, Texas.  It hosted the United States Hockey League's Dallas Texans from 1945 to 1949. The arena held 8,900 people.

References

Indoor ice hockey venues in the United States
Indoor arenas in Texas
Sports venues in Dallas